Senan Hasan Qasem Abdelqader (Arabic: سنان عبدالقادر; born 30 November 1962) is a Palestinian architect and urban planner. In 2007 he participated in the São Paulo Biennale in Brazil, where he published his book entitled Architecture of (in)Dependence.

Abdelqader established his firm Senan Architects in Jerusalem in 1995, and in Jaffa in 2015.

Early life and education
Abdelqader was born on 30 November 1962 in Tayibe, an Arab town located in the central part of Israel. Upon graduating from high school, he moved to Germany and started studying Civil Engineering at Hamburg University of Applied Sciences, before moving to study architecture at University of Kaiserslautern.

Academic
Abdelqader has taught at Tel Aviv University in 1998, and founded the in+Formal Architecture Research Unit in the Bezalel Academy of Arts and Design in 2006. In 2011, he became a guest professor in Dessau Institute of Architecture (DIA) in Germany. 

In the year of 2016, Abdelqader was granted his professorship rank by the Council for Higher Education in Israel, making him the first professor in the history of Palestinians in Israel in the discipline of architecture.

In 2018, Abdelqader established the Institute for the Study of Arab Culture in Visual Arts, Design and Architecture. The Institute works on constructing an academic space that enables interaction with the Arab legacy and modernisation processes in general, and in particular in Palestine.

Major projects

al-Mashrabiya Building, Jerusalem (2012) 
Al-Mashrabiya Building, located in Southern Jerusalem, is a residential and commercial building. Abdelqader described the building as “a contemporary reinterpretation of traditional elements of Arab vernacular architecture”. Like many of his projects, al-Mashrabiya Building carries with it political, social, economic and environmental critique of what he perceives as oppressive and out of context planning policies on the one hand, and conservative, romantic traditionalism on the other.

Selected writings
Architecture of (in)Dependence, 2007

References

External links

 
Xnet, הבית שפונה פנימה: פרשנות חדשה לבנייה המסורתית בבאקה אל גרבייה, November 11, 2019
Bait Venoy, ״סגנון כפרי״? אין דבר כזה, January 24, 2016
Haaretz, מה גרם לאדריכל הפלסטיני הנודע לעזוב את ירושלים, September 10, 2015
The National, Rare hope for Palestinians as Israel approves Jerusalem housing project, April 14, 2015
ArchDaily, The Mashrabiya House / Senan Abdelqader, October 14, 2011
BROWNBOOK, Layered Living, 2012
divisare, A Museum as a Catalyst for Urbanization according to Senan Abdelqader, March 6, 2008
Panet, انتداب المهندس سنان عبد القادر للمشاركة في مؤتمر دولي, August 2, 2007
Panet, سنان عبد القادر: يجب بلورة تصوّر معماري لمجتمعنا, December 8, 2007
Haaretz, סנאן עבדאלקאדר יתכנן את המוזיאון באום אל-פחם, November 6, 2006

Palestinian architects
1962 births
Living people
Academic staff of Tel Aviv University
Technical University of Kaiserslautern alumni
People from Tayibe